Kömürlü can refer to the following villages in Turkey:

 Kömürlü, Adilcevaz
 Kömürlü, Bozyazı
 Kömürlü, Yusufeli